Brivo, Inc. is a smart building company providing cloud-based access control and video surveillance products for physical security and internet of things applications.

Executive Leadership
Steve Van Till is an early Brivo hire (initially as CTO) and today serves as CEO. Dean Drako is chairman of the board.

History
Brivo was co-founded in 1999 by Carter Griffin, Tim Ogilvie and Mark Stein. After completing a series A financing round of individual investors, the company secured an investment from IDEO Ventures, whose affiliate IDEO product design became its development partner for Brivo's first product – a last mile delivery solution for unattended and asynchronous delivery of parcels. In 2002, Griffin, Ogilvie and Stein transitioned the company to what became Brivo's primary market with the introduction of Brivo's  building access control SaaS platform.  In 2002, Brivo introduced cloud-based access control to the physical security market.  The physical access control system works with door card readers and similar devices, and locks or unlock things once an individual has been authenticated.

Brivo released the ACS5000 access control system in 2005, with Ethernet and GSM cellular connectivity options. In 2007, Brivo introduced its XML application programming interface (API). In 2017, Brivo introduced the availability of two new door access controllers, the ACS6000 and the ACS300, to complement its existing product lines, as well as integration with the Authentic Mercury open platform.

Brivo introduced its IP door controller (IPDC) in 2011, an Ethernet access control panel in a compact form factor, with power over ethernet and FIPS 140-2 validated encryption. IPDC used standard network cabling to the door.  In 2013, Brivo announced Brivo Onair, a cloud-based access control and video surveillance physical security system for businesses that automates facility access from one interface.

As of 2015, Brivo stated its cloud-based access control system serviced more than ten million users and more 100,000 access points, such as doors and windows.

In November 2022, Runway Growth Capital announced the closure of a long-term senior secured credit facility of $75 million to Brivo.

Products
Brivo Access. Smart building tool built into the cloud-based Brivo access control platform that organizes and structures data to see events, patterns, with custom reports and charts.
Brivo Snapshot. Video analytics & forensic product for facial and person detection, using machine learning on combined access control and video data streams.

Private acquisition
In June 2015, Brivo was acquired by Dean Drako, Barracuda Networks founder and former CEO, and current president and CEO of Eagle Eye Networks. Drako will serve as Brivo's chairman.

Drako said he saw the opportunity to accelerate the cloud technology shift underway in the physical security industry by combining Brivo's cloud access control with cloud video surveillance from his company Eagle Eye Networks. The two companies will continue to operate as separate entities.

Acquisitions
In March 2020, Brivo announced it acquired Parakeet IoT company as part of its expansion into smart buildings.

Recognition
Gartner named Brivo a “Cool Vendor in Identity and Access Management" for 2014. In the same year, Brivo also released its Social Access Management API.

At the 2018 ISC West Conference, Brivo ACS300 Wireless Access Controller won best product in the “Access Control Software & Controllers” category.

External links

References

companies based in Bethesda, Maryland
electronics companies of the United States
manufacturing companies based in Maryland
physical security